There are two places in County Durham called Hill Top:

 Hill Top, Stanley, near Stanley, County Durham
 Hill Top, Teesdale